Gananoque Water Aerodrome  was located on the St. Lawrence River near Gananoque, Ontario, Canada.

See also
Gananoque Airport

References

Defunct seaplane bases in Ontario